The European Association for Clinical Pharmacology and Therapeutics (EACPT) is a learned society in the field of clinical pharmacology. It is the leading society in Europe serving the European and global Clinical Pharmacology and Therapeutics community. It has its origins in a working party in the early 1980s under the auspices of the World Health Organization (WHO-Europe). Subsequently, a committee was created in 1993 chaired by Folke Sjöqvist with the remit to prepare the first congress of EACPT, held in Paris in 1995. At that congress the founding EACPT Council elected an Executive Committee with Sjöqvist as chairman, Michael Orme (United Kingdom) as Honorary Secretary, Jochen Kuhlmann (Germany) as Treasurer, and Giampaolo Velo (Italy) as Vice-Chairman, with 26 European countries as members through their home country clinical pharmacology society or section. The EACPT now includes all national organisations for clinical pharmacology in Europe and provides educational and scientific support for the more than 4000 individual professionals interested in Clinical Pharmacology and Therapeutics throughout the European region, with its congresses attended by a global audience.

Aims
The EACPT promotes in Europe professional and ethical excellence and standards for clinical use of medicines and clinical research on drugs. The EACPT also aims to advise policy makers on how the specialty can contribute to human health and wealth.

Activities
Activities of the EACPT include advice to policy makers and agencies in Europe, holding European congresses and workshops, and publishing policy papers, meeting reports, proceedings of congresses and constituent symposia, and contents of specific lectures. The EACPT also holds Focus Meetings.

Summer Schools
 2001 Antalya, Turkey  
 2003 Budapest, Hungary 
 2004 Sofia, Bulgaria 
 2006 Vrsac, Serbia 
 2007 Ghent, Belgium 
 2008 Madrid, Spain  
 2009 Alexandroupolis, Greece 
 2010 Dresden, Germany 
 2012 Amsterdam, Netherlands - Education
 2013 Edinburgh, Scotland - Practice and Governance

Focused Meetings
 2014 Nijmegen, Netherlands - Cardiovascular
 2016 Opatija, Croatia - How to Assess Medicines

EACPT Congresses
Congresses are open to delegates from Europe and anywhere in the world, including health professionals, researchers, biotechnology and pharmaceutical industry professionals, regulators, policy makers, ethicists and others interested in drug discovery, and in clinical, cost-effectiveness and safety of medicines and related biomarkers. 
 1995 Paris
 1997 Berlin
 1999 Jerusalem
 2000 Florence
 2001 Odense
 2003 Istanbul
 2005 Poznan
 2007 Amsterdam
 2009 Edinburgh
 2011 Budapest
 2013 Geneva
 2015 Madrid
 2017 Prague
 2019 Stockholm
 2021 Athens

Lifetime achievement awards 
 2009 Folke Sjöqvist, Sweden
 2011 Sir Colin Dollery, United Kingdom
 2013 Carlo Patrono, Italy and Sir Michael Rawlins, United Kingdom
 2015 Michel Eichelbaum, Germany

Scientific award for best publication 
 2009 Ian Wilkinson, Cambridge, United Kingdom
 2011 Tabassome Simon, Paris, France
 2013 David Devos, Lille, France
 2015 Nicholas Bateman, Edinburgh, UK

EACPT-EPHAR Young Investigator Awards in Translational Pharmacology 
 2015 Christoph Schneider, Bern, Switzerland and Daniel Antoine, Liverpool, UK

Special award for services to EACPT
 2013 Michael Orme, United Kingdom

Organisation 
The EACPT is led by an Executive Committee formed from a council of delegates from affiliated national societies for clinical pharmacology and therapeutics. The EACPT also has key Working Groups for Research, Ethics and Regulatory Matters, Education and Young Pharmacologists.

Official EACPT Journal
Clinical Therapeutics

References

External links 
 

Pharmacological societies
European medical and health organizations